Belle and the Devotions were a British pop group, ostensibly a group named after the singer Kit Rolfe. Under this name, she released the singles "Where Did Love Go Wrong?" and "Got to Let You Know" in 1983.

In 1984, two other members, Laura James and Linda Sofield, were added to the group in order to participate in the UK heats of the Eurovision Song Contest, A Song for Europe in 1984. "Love Games", written by Paul Curtis and Graham Sacher, proved to be an easy winner, and represented the UK at the Eurovision Song Contest 1984 in Luxembourg.

According to John Kennedy O'Connor's The Eurovision Song Contest - The Official History, the actions of English football fans in the tiny state the previous autumn caused something of a backlash against the British delegation. They were booed by some of the audience. It emerged during rehearsals that a backing trio, hidden off-camera, were doing the majority of the backing singing, while the microphones of Sofeld and James were not even switched on. "Love Games" finished in seventh place, and reached #11 in the UK Singles Chart. The group followed up this single with "All the Way Up", released in July 1984. It failed to chart and the threesome split up soon after.

Kit Rolfe had been involved in Eurovision before, as a backing singer for Sweet Dreams in Munich in 1983, when she herself was hidden off-camera. She performed the same task for Samantha Janus in 1991, teaming up with Hazell Dean to provide backing vocals in Rome.

Rolfe also later recorded a single with Eddie "The Eagle" Edwards, "Fly Eddie Fly". The song was not a hit.

Discography

Singles

References

External links

Eurovision Song Contest entrants for the United Kingdom
Eurovision Song Contest entrants of 1984
British musical trios
English pop girl groups
English pop music groups
Musical groups established in 1983
Musical groups disestablished in 1984